Kasoor is a 2001 Indian Hindi psychological suspense thriller film produced under Mukesh Bhatt's Vishesh Films and directed by Vikram Bhatt. It features Aftab Shivdasani in his second Bollywood appearance and Lisa Ray in her Bollywood debut. Ray's voice was dubbed by Divya Dutta. The film also stars Apoorva Agnihotri, Irrfan Khan and Ashutosh Rana in supporting roles. It was released on 2 February 2001. The film is an unofficial remake of the 1985 Hollywood film Jagged Edge which stars Jeff Bridges and Glenn Close. The movie was a critical and commercial success.

Plot
The film starts with the murder of Priti, wife of Shekhar, a wealthy and well-known journalist. Inspector Lokhande investigates the case and accuses Shekhar of the murder, saying he has enough evidence to arrest and convict him. However upon getting bail from the court, Shekhar asks his lawyer to fight his case for him however his  lawyer tells him that he will not be able to fight his case because he is a corporate lawyer and only fights civil cases. He suggests Shekhar to ask  Simran Bhargav, who is a skilled criminal lawyer in his firm to fight his case.

Shekhar goes to Simran's house to convince her to take his case. Simran tells Shekhar that she'll defend him only if she is convinced that he is innocent. Simran is battling inner demons over a case in which she got a man convicted for crime he had not committed. Her guilt increases when she learns that the innocent man had committed suicide in custody.

While representing Shekhar, whom she considers innocent, Simran falls in love with him – a part of Shekhar's plan to win her trust. They end up having intimate, passionate and sensual sex. Throughout the case a mysterious man sends clues to Simran which helps her prove Shekhar's innocence. It is revealed that Shekhar was having an affair with another woman and his wife Priti was having an affair with Jimmy Parena. When Simran learns this she is heartbroken and decides to leave the case but Amit tells her to keep fighting the case. After the court declares Shekhar innocent, Simran spends the night with Shekhar at his house. The next morning, while opening his closet, she finds a typewriter hidden between sheets.

The typewriter proved to be the one the mysterious man used to write clue letters to Simran with earlier. Simran realizes this because the typed letters all have a flyaway 't' on them.

Simran realizes that Shekhar is the murderer and the mysterious man who wrote the letters to her. She then contacts Inspector Lokhande about the typewriter. He tells her to come to the police station with the typewriter. She continuously ignores Shekhar who asks her for dinner. Shekhar realizes that Simran knows the truth. Shekhar quickly reaches her house and tries to kill her but Simran kills him in self-defense and reconciles with Amit.

Cast
Aftab Shivdasani as Shekhar Saxena, dubbing by Vikram Bhatt.
Lisa Ray as Advocate Simran Bhargav, dubbing by Divya Dutta.
Apurva Agnihotri as Amit, friend-Assistant Advocate of Simran Bhargav.
Irrfan Khan as Public Prosecutor Nitin Mehta
Divya Dutta as Payal Malhotra, dubbing by Mona Ghosh Shetty. Jimmy Pereira's former girlfriend.
Ashutosh Rana as Senior Inspector Lokhande
Chittaranjan Giri as Sub Inspector 
Anupam Shyam as Sub Inspector Powar
Vineet Sharma as himself (special appearance)
Firdaus Mevawala as Judge
Maleeka Ghai as Priti Saxena, wife of Shekhar Saxena.
Vishwajeet Pradhan as witness Jimmy Pareira, Priti's boyfriend.
Prithvi Zutshi as Mr. Singh, Civil Lawyer.
Sucheta Khanna as witness Shalini, Priti's friend.
Kurush Deboo as witness, Rustam Sodabottleopenerwala
Sushmita Daan as Witness, Miss Rita Desai Shekhar's former girlfriend.
Murali Sharma as Mr. Singal, Simran Bhargav's boss. (special appearance) 
Pushkar Dwivedi as Chotu
Ishwar Patel
Kiran Randhawa

Soundtrack

The music of Kasoor was composed by Nadeem-Shravan. This was their second album after comeback. The lyrics were penned by Sameer. Singer such as Udit Narayan, Kumar Sanu and Alka Yagnik lent their voices for the album. The soundtrack became very popular upon release with songs like "Mohabbat Ho Na Jaaye", "Kitni Bechain Hoke", "Dil Mera Tod Diya" & the remaining becoming a rage among the people especially the youth. The soundtrack attained number 1 position on the all-time music sales music chart of 2001. The soundtrack received a rating of 8/10 from Planet Bollywood.

Track listing

Release
The film was worldwide released on 1st February 2001. The DVD of the film was released by Eros Home Media The distribution rights of the movie was accuired to Sony Pictures Networks India. The television premiere of the movie was occurred on SET India on 7th March 2001 . The film has been made streaming available on YouTube Premium since 2017 .

Reception
The film received mixed reviews from critics. Taran Adarsh of Bollywood Hungama praised the performance of the lead cast saying, "Kasoor scores the most in that one important department — performances. Credit for this must go primarily to the two principal performers — Aftab Shivdasani and Lisa Ray — who come up with proficient performances." Aparajita Saha of Rediff.com stated, "this is a film that attempted an intriguing premise but failed when it didn't fully explore that very premise and take it to its logical and rightful conclusion."

References

External links 
 

Films scored by Nadeem–Shravan
2000s Hindi-language films
2001 films
Films directed by Vikram Bhatt
2000s psychological thriller films
Indian courtroom films
Indian remakes of American films
Indian psychological thriller films
Indian mystery thriller films